Olaniyi Mikail Afonja (born 14 October 1974), well known as Sanyeri, is a Nigerian comedian, actor and film maker.

Early life and education
Born in Bola Area of Oyo town in Oyo State as the first child of his parents, Olaniyi had his formal education at St. Michael Primary School, Òkè-èbó, Oyo State and Durbar
Grammar School, Oyo Town, Oyo State where he finished his secondary school education.

Career
Olaniyi's acting career started in 1992, after joining a theatre group introduced to him by a friend. In 1996, Olaniyi relocated to Lagos State to further his career and has since starred in several Yoruba films.

Filmography

Obakeye
Awero
Edun Ara
Jenifa
Opa Kan
Omo Carwash
Sekere
Mawe Ku
Sanyeri in London
Ibale
Apaadi
Olu Omo
Koboko
Salako Alagbe
Omo Iya Meji
Mama Do Good
Osole
Sanyeri Oloka
Area Boys
Ise Awako
Waheed Kolero
Afoju Meta
Isale Koko
Were Merin
Kosi Tabi sugbon
Saworo
Abuke Oshin

Personal life
Olaniyi is married to Omolara Afonja with whom he has two children.

Awards and nominations

See also
List of Yoruba people

References

Living people
Yoruba male actors
20th-century Nigerian male actors
21st-century Nigerian male actors
Male actors in Yoruba cinema
Actors from Oyo State
1974 births
Nigerian male television actors
Nigerian filmmakers
Nigerian male comedians
Nigerian male film actors
People from Oyo State